Earl Bud Powell, Vol. 1: Early Years of a Genius, 44–48 is the first of eleven albums of Bud Powell material released by Francis Paudras on his Mythic Sound label. It features a selection of Powell's early work from 1944 to 1948.

Track listing
Introduction by Canada Lee
"West End Blues" (King Oliver)
"Perdido" [incomplete] (Juan Tizol)
"When My Baby Left Me" [incomplete] (Eddie Vinson, Cootie Williams)
"Royal Garden Blues" (Spencer Williams, Clarence Williams) – 3:17
"Roll 'Em" (Cootie Williams) – 2:54
"A-Tisket, A-Tasket" (Ella Fitzgerald, Van Alexander) – 2:49
"Do Nothin' Till You Hear From Me" (Duke Ellington, Bob Russell) – 2:34
"Smack Me" (a.k.a. "You Talk a Little Trash" and "The Boppers") (Cootie Williams) – 3:07
"Air Mail Special" (a.k.a. "Good Enough to Keep") (Charlie Christian, Benny Goodman, Jimmy Mundy)
"One O'Clock Jump" [incomplete] (Count Basie)
Introduction by Leonard Feather
"Perdido" (Tizol)
"Indiana" (James Hanley, Ballard MacDonald)

Personnel
Bud Powell – piano (all tracks)
Tracks 1-2. The Canada Lee Show, New York, July 4, 1944
Cootie Williams – trumpet
unknown – bass
Canada Lee – announcer
Tracks 3-5. Radio broadcast from the Apollo Theater or the Savoy Ballroom, New York, ca. January–May, 1944Tracks 6-11. AFRS "Jubilee" Broadcast, NBC Studios, Hollywood, May 1, 1944
Ermit V. Perry – trumpet
Tommy Stevenson – trumpet
George Treadwell – trumpet
Cootie Williams – trumpet
Lammar Wright  – trumpet
Ed Burke – trombone
Ed Glover – trombone
Robert Horton  – trombone
Frank Powell – alto sax
Eddie "Cleanhead" Vinson – alto sax
Lee Pope – tenor sax
Sam "The Man" Taylor – tenor sax
Eddie de Verteuil – baritone sax
Leroy Kirkland – guitar
Carl Pruitt – bass
Sylvester "Vess" Payne – drums
Ella Fitzgerald – vocals (tracks 7-8 only)
unknown – announcer (New York only)
Ernie "Bubbles" Whitman – announcer (Hollywood only)
Tracks 12-14. Radio broadcast from the Royal Roost, New York, December 19, 1948
Benny Harris – trumpet
J.J. Johnson – trombone
Buddy DeFranco – clarinet
Lee Konitz – alto sax
Budd Johnson – tenor sax
Cecil Payne – baritone sax
Chuck Wayne – guitar
Nelson Boyd – bass
Max Roach – drums
Leonard Feather – announcer

References

Bud Powell compilation albums
1989 compilation albums